Broad Oak is a small village in the Rother district, in eastern East Sussex, England, referred to also as Broad Oak Brede, as there is a village with the same name by Heathfield. In 2020 it had an estimated population of 883.

Transport
The main A28 and minor B2089 roads meet at a crossroads in Broad Oak, with the destinations of Tenterden, Rye, Battle and Hastings.

References 

Villages in East Sussex
Brede, East Sussex